Table tennis has been contested at the Asian Games since 1958 except in 1970 edition, with singles and doubles events for both men and women.

Editions

Events

Medal table

List of medalists

References 
ITTF Database
List of medalists at Sports123.com

 
Sports at the Asian Games
Asian Games
Asian Games